The 1991–92 daytime network television schedule for the four major English-language commercial broadcast networks in the United States covers the weekday and weekend daytime hours from September 1991 to August 1992. The schedule is followed by a list per network of returning series, new series, and series canceled after the 1990–91 season.

Legend

 New series are highlighted in bold.

Schedule
 All times correspond to U.S. Eastern and Pacific Time scheduling (except for some live sports or events). Except where affiliates slot certain programs outside their network-dictated timeslots, subtract one hour for Central, Mountain, Alaska, and Hawaii-Aleutian times.
 Local schedules may differ, as affiliates have the option to pre-empt or delay network programs. Such scheduling may be limited to preemptions caused by local or national breaking news or weather coverage (which may force stations to tape delay certain programs in overnight timeslots or defer them to a co-operated station or digital subchannel in their regular timeslot) and any major sports events scheduled to air in a weekday timeslot (mainly during major holidays). Stations may air shows at other times at their preference.

Monday–Friday

ABC note: ABC rescinded the noon time slot to affiliates on August 17. Many ABC affiliates preempted network programming to air local news in the noon time slot. Loving was now available to affiliates at noon/11:00 CT or 12:30/11:30 CT.

Saturday

Sunday

By network

ABC

Returning series:
ABC Weekend Special
ABC World News This Morning
ABC World News Tonight with Peter Jennings
All My Children
Beetlejuice
The Bugs Bunny and Tweety Show
General Hospital
Good Morning America
The Home Show
Loving
The New Adventures of Winnie the Pooh
One Life to Live
Slimer! and the Real Ghostbusters
This Week with David Brinkley

New series:
Darkwing Duck
Hammerman
Land of the Lost
The Pirates of Dark Water

Not returning from 1990–91:
Little Rosey
Match Game
New Kids on the Block
A Pup Named Scooby-Doo
The Wizard of Oz

CBS

Returning series:
As the World Turns
The Bold and the Beautiful
CBS Evening News
CBS Morning News
CBS News Sunday Morning
CBS Storybreak 
CBS This Morning
Designing Women 
Face the Nation
Family Feud
Garfield and Friends
Guiding Light
Jim Henson's Muppet Babies
The Price Is Right
Teenage Mutant Ninja Turtles
The Young and the Restless

New series:
Back to the Future
Family Feud Challenge
Inspector Gadget 
Mother Goose and Grimm
Riders in the Sky
Where's Waldo?

Not returning from 1990–91:
The Adventures of Raggedy Ann and Andy 
The Barbara DeAngelis Show
Bill and Ted's Excellent Adventures (moved to Fox Kids Network)
Dink, the Little Dinosaur
Pee-wee's Playhouse
Soap Star Family Feud
Wheel of Fortune

Fox

Returning series:
Attack of the Killer Tomatoes
Beetlejuice
Bill & Ted's Excellent Adventures (Moved from CBS)
Bobby's World
Fox's Peter Pan & the Pirates
Tom & Jerry Kids Show (retitled Tom & Jerry Kids)

New series:
Jim Henson's Muppet Babies 
Little Dracula (limited series)
Little Shop
Taz-Mania

Not returning from 1990-91:
Fox's Fun House
Piggsburg Pigs
Swamp Thing
Zazoo U

NBC

Returning series:
Another World
Captain N: The Game Master
A Closer Look/The Faith Daniels Show
Classic Concentration 
Days of Our Lives
Meet the Press
NBA Inside Stuff
NBC News at Sunrise
NBC Nightly News
Santa Barbara
Saturday Morning Videos
Saved by the Bell
Today

New series:
Chip and Pepper's Cartoon Madness
Dr. Dean
One on One with John Tesh
ProStars
Saturday TodaySpace CatsSuper Mario WorldWish KidYo Yogi!Not returning from 1990–91:'The Adventures of Super Mario Bros. 3Camp CandyThe Chipmunks Go to the MoviesCover to CoverFull House GenerationsGravedale HighGuys Next DoorKid 'n PlayLet's Make a DealThe Marsha Warfield ShowTo Tell the TruthTrialWatchWheel of Fortune'' (continuing in syndication)

See also
1991-92 United States network television schedule (prime-time)
1991-92 United States network television schedule (late night)

Sources
https://web.archive.org/web/20071015122215/http://curtalliaume.com/abc_day.html
https://web.archive.org/web/20071015122235/http://curtalliaume.com/cbs_day.html
https://web.archive.org/web/20071012211242/http://curtalliaume.com/nbc_day.html
https://kidsblockblog.wordpress.com/2012/10/25/fox-kids-weekday-lineups-1990-1993/

United States weekday network television schedules
1991 in American television
1992 in American television